Jean Aniset (born 15 September 1934) is a Luxembourgian long-distance runner. He competed in the marathon at the 1964 Summer Olympics.

References

External links
 

1934 births
Living people
Athletes (track and field) at the 1960 Summer Olympics
Athletes (track and field) at the 1964 Summer Olympics
Luxembourgian male long-distance runners
Luxembourgian male marathon runners
Olympic athletes of Luxembourg
People from Dudelange